The elaboration likelihood model (ELM) of persuasion is a dual process theory describing the change of attitudes. The ELM was developed by Richard E. Petty and John Cacioppo in 1980. The model aims to explain different ways of processing stimuli, why they are used, and their outcomes on attitude change. The ELM proposes two major routes to persuasion: the central route and the peripheral route.

 Under the central route, persuasion will likely result from a person's careful and thoughtful consideration of the true merits of the information presented in support of an advocacy. The central route involves a high level of message elaboration in which a great amount of cognition about the arguments are generated by the individual receiving the message. The results of attitude change will be relatively enduring, resistant, and predictive of behavior. 
 On the other hand, under the peripheral route, persuasion results from a person's association with positive or negative cues in the stimulus or making a simple inference about the merits of the advocated position. The cues received by the individual under the peripheral route are generally unrelated to the logical quality of the stimulus. These cues will involve factors such as the credibility or attractiveness of the sources of the message, or the production quality of the message. The likelihood of elaboration will be determined by an individual's motivation and ability to evaluate the argument being presented.
For instance, as the picture shows, a person is considering buying a car and he is persuaded by his friend to buy a certain model. If he processes his friend’s message by taking the central route, he will carefully evaluate his friend’s argument and rationally think about the cost, reliability, fuel efficiency of this model. Once he generates favorable thought along the central route, the ELM predicts he will accept the message and the result is enduring. However, if he uses the peripheral route to process the message, he will be likely to buy the car simply because he likes the color, or a famous idol on television “asks” him to buy this car. Compared to the central route’s effect, thoughts generated from the peripheral route will be relatively short-lasting.

Origin
Elaboration likelihood model is a general theory of attitude change. According to the theory's developers Richard E. Petty and John T. Cacioppo, they intended to provide a general "framework for organizing, categorizing, and understanding the basic processes underlying the effectiveness of persuasive communications".

The study of attitudes and persuasion began as the central focus of social psychology, featured in the work of psychologists Gordon Allport (1935) and Edward Alsworth Ross (1908). Allport described attitudes as "the most distinctive and indispensable concept in contemporary social psychology". Considerable research was devoted to the study of attitudes and persuasion from the 1930s through the late 1970s. These studies embarked on various relevant issues regarding attitudes and persuasion, such as the consistency between attitudes and behaviors and the processes underlying attitude/behavior correspondence. However, Petty and Cacioppo noticed a major problem facing attitude and persuasion researchers to the effect that there was minimal agreement regarding "if, when, and how the traditional source, message, recipient, and channel variables affected attitude change". Noticing this problem, Petty and Cacioppo developed the elaboration likelihood model as their attempt to account for the differential persistence of communication-induced attitude change. Petty and Cacioppo suggested that different empirical findings and theories on attitude persistence could be viewed as stressing one of two routes to persuasion which they presented in their elaboration likelihood model.

Core ideas 
There are four core ideas to the ELM.

 The ELM argues that when a person encounters some form of communication, they can process this communication with varying levels of thought (elaboration), ranging from a low degree of thought (low elaboration) to a high degree of thought (high elaboration). Factors that contribute to elaboration includes different motivations, abilities, opportunities, etc.
 The ELM predicts that there are a variety of psychological processes of change that operate to varying degrees as a function of a person's level of elaboration. On the lower end of the continuum are the processes that require relatively little thought, including classical conditioning and mere exposure . On the higher end of the continuum are processes that require relatively more thought, including expectancy-value and cognitive response processes . When lower elaboration processes predominate, a person is said to be using the peripheral route, which is contrasted with the central route, involving the operation of predominantly high elaboration processes.
 The ELM predicts that the degree of thought used in a persuasion context determines how consequential the resultant attitude becomes. Attitudes formed via high-thought, central-route processes will tend to persist over time, resist persuasion, and be influential in guiding other judgments and behaviors to a greater extent than attitudes formed through low-thought, peripheral-route processes.
 The ELM also predicts that any given variable can have multiple roles in persuasion, including acting as a cue to judgment or as an influence on the direction of thought about a message. The ELM holds that the specific role by which a variable operates is determined by the extent of elaboration.

Assumptions 
Assumption 1: “People are motivated to hold correct attitudes”

Assumption 2: “Although people want to hold correct attitudes, the amount and nature of issue relevant elaboration in which they are willing or able to engage to evaluate a message vary with individual and situational factors”

Assumption 3: “Variables can affect the amount and direction of attitude change by:

Serving as persuasive arguments;

Serving as peripheral cues; and/or

Affecting the extent or direction of issue and argument elaboration”

Assumption 4: “Variables affecting motivation and/or ability to process a message in a relatively objective manner can do so by either enhancing or reducing argument scrutiny”

Assumption 5: "Variables affecting message processing in a relatively biased manner can produce either a positive (favorable) or negative (unfavorable) motivational and/or ability bias to the issue-relevant thoughts attempted”

Assumption 6: "As motivation and/or ability to process arguments is decreased, peripheral cues become relatively more important determinants of persuasion. Conversely, as argument scrutiny is increased, peripheral cues become relatively less important determinants of persuasion."

Assumption 7: "Attitude changes that result mostly from processing issue-relevant arguments (central route) will show greater temporal persistence, greater prediction of behavior and greater resistance to counter-persuasion than attitude changes that result mostly from peripheral cues."

Routes 
The elaboration likelihood model proposes two distinct routes for information processing: a central route and a peripheral route. The ELM holds that there are numerous specific processes of change on the "elaboration continuum" ranging from low to high. When the operation processes at the low end of the continuum determine attitudes, persuasion follows the peripheral route. When the operation processes at the high end of the continuum determine attitudes, persuasion follows the central route.

Central route 

The central route is used when the message recipient has the motivation as well as the ability to think about the message and its topic. When people process information centrally, the cognitive responses, or elaborations, will be much more relevant to the information, whereas when processing peripherally, the individual may rely on heuristics and other rules of thumb when elaborating on a message. Being at the high end of the elaboration continuum, people assess object-relevant information in relation to schemas that they already possess, and arrive at a reasoned attitude that is supported by information. It is important to consider two types of factors that influence how and how much one will elaborate on a persuasive message. The first are the factors that influence our motivation to elaborate, and the second are the factors that influence our ability to elaborate. Motivation to process the message may be determined by a personal interest in the subject of the message, or individual factors like the need for cognition. However, if the message recipient has a strong, negative attitude toward the position proposed by the message, a boomerang effect (an opposite effect) is likely to occur. That is, they will resist the message and may move away from the proposed position. Two advantages of the central route are that attitude changes tend to last longer and are more predictive of behavior than the changes from the peripheral route. Overall, as people’s motivation and ability to process the message and develop elaborations decreases, the peripheral cues present in the situation become more important in their processing of the message.

Peripheral route
The peripheral route is used when the message recipient has little or no interest in the subject and/or has a lesser ability to process the message. Being at the low end of the elaboration continuum, recipients do not examine the information as thoroughly. With the peripheral route, they are more likely to rely on general impressions (e.g. "this feels right/good"), early parts of the message, their own mood, positive and negative cues of the persuasion context, etc. Because people are "cognitive misers", looking to reduce mental effort, they often use the peripheral route and thus rely on heuristics (mental shortcuts) when processing information. When an individual is not motivated to centrally process an issue because they lack interest in it, or if the individual does not have the cognitive ability to centrally process the issue, then these heuristics can be quite persuasive. Robert Cialdini's Principles of Social Influence (1984), which include commitment, social proof, scarcity, reciprocation, authority, as well as liking the person who is persuading you, are some examples of frequently used heuristics. In addition, credibility can also be used as a heuristic in peripheral thinking because when a speaker is seen as having a higher credibility, then the listener may be more likely to believe the message. Credibility is a low-effort and somewhat reliable way to give us an answer of what to decide and/or believe without having to put in much work to think it through. Peripheral route processing involves a low level of elaboration. The user isn’t scrutinizing the message for its effectiveness.

If these peripheral influences go completely unnoticed, the message recipient is likely to maintain their previous attitude towards the message. Otherwise, the individual will temporarily change his attitude towards it. This attitude change can be long-lasting, although durable change is less likely to occur than it is with the central route.

Determinants of route
The two most influential factors that affect which processing route an individual uses are motivation (the desire to process the message; see Petty and Cacioppo, 1979) and ability (the capability for critical evaluation; see Petty, Wells and Brock, 1976). The extent of motivation is in turn affected by attitude and personal relevance. Individuals' ability for elaboration is affected by distractions, their cognitive busyness (the extent to which their cognitive processes are engaged by multiple tasks), and their overall knowledge.

Motivation 
Attitudes towards a message can affect motivation. Drawing from cognitive dissonance theory, when people are presented with new information (a message) that conflicts with existing beliefs, ideas, or values, they will be motivated to eliminate the dissonance, in order to remain at peace with their own thoughts. For instance, people who want to believe that they will be academically successful may recall more of their past academic successes than their failures. They may also use their world knowledge to construct new theories about how their particular personality traits may predispose them to academic success (Kunda, 1987). If they succeed in accessing and constructing appropriate beliefs, they may feel justified in concluding that they will be academically successful, not realizing that they also possess knowledge that could be used to support the opposite conclusion.

Personal relevance can also affect an individual's degree of motivation. For instance, undergraduate students were told of a new exam policy that would take effect either one or ten years later. The proposal of the new exam policy was either supported by strong or weak arguments. Those students who were going to personally be affected by this change would think more about the issue than those students who were not going to be personally affected.

An additional factor that affects degree of motivation is an individual's need for cognition. Individuals who take greater pleasure in thinking than others tend to engage in more effortful thinking because of its intrinsic enjoyment for them, regardless of the importance of the issue to them or the need to be correct.

Ability 
Ability includes the availability of cognitive resources (for instance, the absence of time pressures or distractions) and the relevant knowledge needed to examine arguments. Distractions (for instance, noise in a library where a person is trying to read a journal article) can decrease a person's ability to process a message. Cognitive busyness, which can also serve as a distraction, limits the cognitive resources otherwise available for the task at hand (assessing a message). Another factor of ability is familiarity with the relevant subject. Though they might not be distracted nor cognitively busy, their insufficiency in knowledge can hinder people's engagement in deep thinking.

Opportunity 
Some psychologists lump opportunity in with Ability as it primarily relates to the time available to the individual to make a decision.  The popular train of thought today is that this is a category of its own. Factors related to ability to think includes: time pressure, message repetition, distraction, knowledge, fatigue, social pressure, etc.

Message repetition enables more argument scrutiny. If the argument is strong, repetition leads to more change in attitude. For example, in marketing research, advertising leads to a favorable brand attitude as long as the arguments are strong and tedium is not induced. However, it is noticeable that repetition does not always lead to more attitude change. The effect of repetition also depends on other factors such as content of argument, and previous knowledge and attitude.

When Distraction is high, elaboration is lower due to limited mental power. In this case, people are less influenced by the quality of the argument in a persuasive message. Rather, they focus on simple source cues. Keeping other factors constant, a stronger argument leads to more attitude change when distraction is low; and a weak argument could lead to more attitude change when distraction is high.

Variables 
A variable is essentially anything that can increase or decrease the persuasiveness of a message. Attractiveness, mood and expertise are just a few examples of variables that can influence persuasiveness. Variables can serve as arguments or peripheral cues to affect the persuasiveness of a message. According to the ELM, changing the quality of an argument or providing a cue in a persuasive context could influence the persuasiveness of a message and affect receivers’ attitudes.

Under high elaboration, a given variable (e.g., expertise) can serve as an argument (e.g., "If Einstein agrees with the theory of relativity, then this is a strong reason for me to as well") or a biasing factor (e.g., "If an expert agrees with this position it is probably good, so let me see who else agrees with this conclusion"), at the expense of contradicting information. Under low-elaboration conditions, a variable may act as a peripheral cue (e.g., the belief that "experts are always right"). While this is similar to the Einstein example above, this is a shortcut which (unlike the Einstein example) does not require thought. Under moderate elaboration, a variable may direct the extent of information processing (e.g., "If an expert agrees with this position, I should really listen to what they have to say"). If subjects are under conditions of moderate elaboration, variables might enhance or reduce the persuasiveness in an objective manner, or bialy motivate or inhibit subjects to generate a certain thought. For instance, a distraction could serve as a variable to objectively affect the persuasiveness of a message. The distraction will enhance the persuasion of a weak argument but reduce the persuasion of a strong argument. (As the Figure III (Reduce) suggests.)

Recent scholars studied persuasion combining ELM with another concept self-validation: to affect the extent to which a person trusts their thoughts in response to a message (self-validation role). A person not only needs to have an attitude towards a message, but also needs to trust their own attitude as correct one so this message can influence their behaviors. If they do not deem themself as correct, they will mentally abandon their own thought. Because of its metacognitive nature, self-validation only occurs in high-elaboration conditions. The ELM posts that variables (credulity, happiness, etc.) can influence the amount and direction of processing, and self-validation postulates that those variables can affect how people use their thoughts as well. For example, when people are generating favorable thoughts about a new idea, they will be more self-affirmed if they are nodding their heads (a variable). Conversely, if they are shaking their heads, they will be less self-affirmed about their thoughts. (See more examples in Postures)

Consequences
For an individual intent on forming long-lasting beliefs on topics, the central route is advantageous by the fact that arguments are scrutinized intensely and that information is unlikely to be overlooked. However, this route uses a considerable amount of energy, time, and mental effort.

It is not worthwhile to exert considerable mental effort to achieve correctness in all situations and people do not always have the requisite knowledge, time, or opportunity to thoughtfully assess the merits of a proposal. For those, the use of the peripheral route excels at saving energy, time, and mental effort. This is particularly advantageous in situations in which one must make a decision within a small time constraint. On the other hand, the peripheral route is prone to errors in judgment, at least in attributing reasons for behaviors. Also, people are persuaded in peripheral routes based on import cues such as credibility of the information source. However, the sleeper effect could influence the strength of persuasion.

It is noteworthy that high elaboration does not necessarily lead to attitude change. Resistance to persuasion occurs when someone feels their freedom to perform a certain behavior is threatened. A famous study on reaction is conducted by Pennebaker and Sanders in 1976. The experimenters placed placard in campus toilets to discourage graffiti. The result of experiment suggests the amount of graffiti written on the threatening placards was significantly positively related to both authority and threat level. Findings are interpreted as reflecting reactance arousal.

In addition, inoculation theory must also be taken into account when it comes to persuasion.

Applications
Researchers have applied the elaboration likelihood model to many fields, including advertising, marketing, consumer behavior and health care, just to name a few.

In advertising and marketing

The elaboration likelihood model can be applied to advertising and marketing.

In 1983, Petty, Cacioppo and Schumann conducted a study to examine source effects in advertising. It was a product advertisement about a new disposable razor. The authors purposefully made one group of subjects highly involved with the product, by telling them the product would be test marketed soon in the local area and by the end of the experiment they would be given a chance to get a disposable razor. Whereas, the authors made another group of subjects have low involvement with the product by telling them that the product would be test marketed in a distant city and by the end of the experiment they would have the chance to get a toothpaste. In addition to varying involvement, the authors also varied source and message characteristics by showing a group of the subjects ads featuring popular athletes, whereas showing other subjects ads featuring average citizens; showing some subjects ads with strong arguments and others ads with weak arguments. This experiment shows that when the elaboration likelihood was low, featuring famous athletes in the advertisement would lead to more favorable product attitudes, regardless of the strength of the product attributes presented. Whereas when elaboration likelihood was high, only the argument strength would manipulate affected attitudes. Lee et al. supported the studies on that product involvement strengthens the effects of "endorser–product congruence on consumer responses" when the endorsers expertise is well related with product to create source credibility. Lee's finding also helps to understand celebrity endorsement as not only a peripheral cue but also a motivation for central route.

Later in 1985, Bitner, Mary J., and Carl Obermiller expand this model theoretically in the field of marketing. They proposed in the marketing context, the determinant of routes is more complex, involving variables of situation, person, and product categories.

It is widely acknowledged that effects of ads are not only limited to the information contained in the ad alone but are also a function of the different appeals used in the ads (like use celebrities or non-celebrities as endorsers). In a study conducted by Rollins and Bhutada in 2013, ELM theory was the framework used to understand and evaluate the underlying mechanisms describing the relationships between endorser type, disease state involvement and consumer response to direct-to-consumer advertisements (DTCA). The finding showed while endorser type did not significantly affect consumer attitudes, behavioral intentions and information search behavior; level of disease state involvement, though, did. More highly involved consumers had more positive attitudes, behavioral intentions and greater information search behavior.

Since social media become a popular marketing platform as well, some scholars also use the ELM to examine how purchase intentions, brand attitudes, and advertising attitudes could be affected by interactivity and source authority on social media platforms. Ott et al. conducted an experiment by presenting participants with Facebook posts from a fictitious company and analyzing their attitude change. The results shows that high and medium interactivity (which means numbers of responses from company representatives on social media posts would: 1) enhance the perceived informativeness (consumers can get useful information from advertising), and then strengthen positive attitudes and purchase intentions; Or 2) increase perceived dialogues, which led to increasing perceived informativeness and then positive attitudes and purchase intentions. However, high interactivity without the perceived informativeness would generate negative attitudes and low purchase intentions. This study has suggested that to some extent companies should engage audience in a systematic processing way in social media advertisings, as consumers elaborate along central route will generate more positive attitudes and higher purchase intentions.

Caveat 

 However, when looking into advertising among young people, Te'eni-Harari et al. found out that in contradistinction to adults, ELM does not hold true for the young. Instead of two information processing routes, young people are less influenced by motivation and ability variables, hence only one route. Their findings also indicate young people are representative of the less intellectually oriented population at large, who probably only have one route to process information.
 Although using peripheral cues is a persuasive choice, advertisers need to be extremely careful in addressing some issues to avoid controversy, such as using sacred symbols as peripheral cues in advertising.

In healthcare

Recent research has been conducted to apply the ELM to the healthcare field. In 2009, Angst and Agarwal published a research article, "Adoption of Electronic Health Records in the Presence of Privacy Concerns: the Elaboration Likelihood Model and Individual Persuasion". This research studies electronic health records (EHRs), (an individual's) concern for information privacy (CFIP) and the elaboration likelihood model (ELM). The two researchers aimed to investigate the question, "Can individuals be persuaded to change their attitudes and opt-in behavioral intentions toward EHRs, and allow their medical information to be digitized even in the presence of significant privacy concerns?"

Since the ELM model provides an understanding how to influence attitudes, the said model could be leveraged to alter perceptions and attitudes regarding adoption and adaptation of change.

Findings of the research included:
 "Issue involvement and argument framing interact to influence attitude change, and that concern for information privacy further moderates the effects of these variables."
 "Likelihood of adoption is driven by concern for information privacy and attitude."
 "An individual's CFIP interacts with argument framing and issue involvement to affect attitudes toward EHR use and CFIP directly influence opt-in behavioral intentions."
 "Even people who have high concerns for privacy, their attitudes can be positively altered with appropriate message framing."

In e-commerce 

Chen and Lee conducted a study about online shopping persuasion by applying the elaboration likelihood model back to 2008. In this study, how online shopping influences consumers' beliefs and perceived values on attitude and approach behavior were examined. "Twenty cosmetics and 20 hotel websites were selected for participants to randomly link to and read, and the students were then asked to fill in a 48-item questionnaire via the internet. It was found that when consumers have higher levels of agreeableness and conscientiousness, central route website contents would be more favorable for eliciting utilitarian shopping value; whereas when consumers have higher levels of emotional stability, openness, and extraversion, peripheral route website contents would be more critical in facilitating experiential and hedonic shopping value", Chen explained.

In 2009, another study about the effects of consumer skepticism on online shopping was conducted by Sher and Lee. Data on young customers' attitudes about a product were acquired through an online experiment with 278 college students, and two findings emerged after analysis. First, highly skeptical consumers tend to stick with their original impression than been influenced by other factors (Central Route); which means, they are biased against certain types of information and indifferent to the message quality. Second, consumers with low skepticism tend to adopt the peripheral route in forming attitude; that is, they are more persuaded by online review quantity. Lee indicated, "these findings contribute to the ELM research literature by considering a potentially important personality factor in the ELM framework".

Other studies applied ELM in e-commerce and internet related fields are listed below for your additional references:
 How does web personalization affect users attitudes and behaviors online?
 An eye-tracking study of online shopping to understand how customers use ELM in their e-commerce experience.
 Using an elaboration likelihood approach to better understand the persuasiveness of website privacy assurance cues for online consumers.
 Multichannel retailing's use of central and peripheral routes through Internet and cross-channel platforms.
 Using ELM and signaling theory to analyze Internet recruitment.

In media 

Scholars have studied whether media modalities will serve as variable to affect which processing route to take. The previous researches by Chaiken suggested that audio and video modes tended to led receivers to heuristic processing (taking the peripheral route) rather than engage in systematic processing (taking the central route). Bootb-Butterfield and Gutowski have studied how media modalities, argument quality, and source credibility interact to influence receivers to process messages. Bootb-Butterfield and Gutowski conducted an experiment by providing students with strong or weak arguments from high or low credible sources in print, audio, or video modes. By giving participants with negative thought topics, experiment results shows that media modalities, source credibility, and argument quality have significant interactions in attitudes change and elaboration mounts: Within the print mode, the interaction between source credibility and argument quality was the least, partly confirmed that print mode would generate systematic processing. And participants generated more unfavorable thoughts towards weak arguments than strong arguments. Within the audio mode, there was no difference between weak and strong arguments with low credible sources; But, weak arguments with high credible sources generate more unfavorable thoughts than strong arguments. Within the video mode, arguments with low credible sources had no difference in elaboration mounts, while strong arguments with high credible sources produced more thoughts.

Many else research on how media content triggered the central or peripheral processing and lead to attitude change. In order to reduce youth smoking by developing improved methods to communicate with higher risk youth, Flynn and his colleagues conducted a study in 2013, exploring the potential of smoking prevention messages on TV based on the ELM. "Structured evaluations of 12 smoking prevention messages based on three strategies derived from the ELM were conducted in classroom settings among a diverse sample of non-smoking middle school students in three states. Students categorized as likely to have higher involvement in a decision to initiate cigarette smoking, are reported relatively high ratings on a cognitive processing indicator for messages focused on factual arguments about negative consequences of smoking than for messages with fewer or no direct arguments. Message appeal ratings did not show greater preference for this message type among higher involved versus lower involved students. Ratings from students reporting lower academic achievement suggested difficulty processing factual information presented in these messages. The ELM may provide a useful strategy for reaching adolescents at risk for smoking initiation, but particular attention should be focused on lower academic achievers to ensure that messages are appropriate for them."

Another research directed by Boyce and Kuijer was focusing on media body ideal images triggers food intake among restrained eaters based on ELM. Their hypotheses were based on restraint theory and the ELM. From the research, they found participants' attention (advertent/inadvertent) toward the images was manipulated. Although restrained eaters' weight satisfaction was not significantly affected by either media exposure condition, advertent (but not inadvertent) media exposure triggered restrained eaters' eating. These results suggest that teaching restrained eaters how to pay less attention to media body ideal images might be an effective strategy in media–literary interventions.

Braverman researched on combining media modality and content design. She directed a study focusing on the persuasion effects of informational (anecdotal evidence) and testimonial messages (personal stories or experience) in text or audio modes. Study results supported that people in low issue-relevance would be persuaded more by testimonial messages, while people in high issue-relevance would be persuaded more by informational messages. She also found that text was more effective for informational messages, whereas audio was relatively more effective for testimonial messages.

With the development of the internet and the emerging new media, L. G. Pee (2012) has conduct interesting research on the influence of trust on social media using the ELM theory. The findings resulted that source credibility, the majority influence, and information quality has strong effect on the trust for users.

Scholars have also studied on how the ELM functions on Connective-collective action on social media. "Connective-collective activities" means ones are able to receive other's personal opinions and add responses to them, so the information will be accumulated and turned into a collective one. On social media there four types of activities are considered as connective-collective: 1) commenting; 2) uploading materials; 3) relaying information received; 4) affiliating (i.e. Liking, following, etc.). Nekmat et al. have suggested that the overabundance of information on social media might not induce audience to heuristic processing; instead, source attributes such as credibility and personalness (which means the closeness of friends in a circle) will be mediated by elaboration cognition. Nekmat et al. found that personalness was positively related to elaboration and users with elaboration cognition were more willing to participant in connective-collective activities. They speculated that this was due to the need to cross the private-public boundary when interacting on social media gave people burdens.

Molina and Jennings focused on whether civil and uncivil behaviors on Facebook serve as cues to encourage users' willingness to participant in a discussion. By presenting experiment participants with Facebook posts and comments (civil or uncivil), they found that: civil comments will encourage more elaboration and therefore generate more willingness to engage in a discussion than uncivil comments; the more elaboration participants generate, the more they are willing to participant in the discussion.

In politics 
The ELM has been studied with regard to its usefulness in politics and voting specifically. The work of Terry Chmielewski (University of Wisconsin-Eau Claire) found "moderate-to-strong support for the applicability of E-L-M to voting." This finding came through the study of voters in the 2004 and 2008 elections for President of the United States.  
Continuing on that thread, the work of Wood and Herbst found that, "family and significant others were more influential than celebrities in engendering support for a political candidate." This indicates that peripheral route processes may have some influence on some voters; however, family and friends are likely to be more influential than those who do not have a personal connection to specific voters. 
Hans-Joachim Mosler applied ELM to study if and how a minority can persuade the majority to change its opinion.

The study used Agent-based social simulation. There were five agents, three (or four) of whom held a neutral opinion on some abstract topic, while the other two (or one) held a different opinion. In addition, there were differences between the agents regarding their argument quality and peripheral cues. The simulation was done in rounds. In each round, one of the agents had an opportunity to influence the other agents. The level of influence was determined by either the argument strength (if the central route was taken) or the peripheral cues (if the peripheral route was taken). After two rounds of persuasion, the distance between the majority's original opinion to its new opinion was studied. It was found that, the peripheral cues of the minority were more important than the argument quality. I.e, a minority with strong arguments but negative cues (e.g., different skin-color or bad reputation) did not succeed in convincing the majority, while a minority with weak arguments and positive cues (e.g., appearance or reputation) did succeed. The results depend also on the level of personal relevance – how much the topic is important to the majority and to the minority.

Partisan Media impact on Persuasion

Scholars also studied how partisan cues in media content will affect elaboration direction and mount. Jennings combined social identity theory and elaboration likelihood model to study whether identities will motivate audience to only rely on partisan cues on media to process information, and whether partisan cues would inhibit audience from learning. Jennings's experiment provided participants with a nonpartisan or partisan article at first and used questionnaires to test their elaboration and learning outcomes. The results supported Jennings hypotheses: articles with partisan cues would prevent partisans from learning more information in the article, compared to articles without partisan cues. Besides, nonpartisan articles would relatively generate more positive thoughts than partisan articles. Also, partisan members tend to elaborate more negative thoughts when exposed to out-group's information, and partisan members will elaborate more positive thoughts when exposed to in-group's messages. For instance, Republicans will come out of more negative reasons why a Democrat senator should not be elected, while Democrats will generate more positive reasons to elect a Democrat senator.

Social Media impact on politics

ELM has been utilized to look at the effect of social media on politics. One study on the effect of Twitter on politics, by Wu, Wong, Deng, and Chang, found that certain types of tweets (1 central route, 1 peripheral route) are most effective in political persuasion. Informative tweets (central) have been shown to produce a consistent impact on opinion convergence. Affective tweets (peripheral) have been shown to be more inconsistent.

Persuasion tactics conducted by Ideological Groups

Dunbar et al. studied on how violent and nonviolent ideological groups developed their persuasion strategy online. Ideological groups (or ethnic groups) are people who shared similar values such as religious beliefs, political beliefs, and social movements which distinguish them from out-group members. Some ideological groups are considered as violent because they acquiesce use of violence to achieve their values. For instance, the American Society for the Prevention of Cruelty to Animals’ website advocated their ideas nonviolently, while ISIS website sanctioned and prioritized violent acts for their goals. Dunbar et al. have studied how nonviolent ideological groups and violent groups used tactics to induce central or peripheral processing, and surprisingly found that both nonviolent ideological and violent groups applied more central cues than peripheral cues in their persuasion, in another word, they adopted more arguments and evidence than simply designing a visually attractive website or idolizing someone. Besides, violent ideological groups used more fear appeals to their audience, and interacted less with their audience. Dunbar et al. speculated that some extreme groups desired to have tight control over their content so they had low tolerance for other's opinions.

In mental health counseling 

Counseling and stigma

One of the most common reasons why an individual does not attend counseling is because they are worried about the falling into a stigma (being considered crazy, or having serious “issues”). This stigma, which was prevalent 30 years ago, still exists today. Fortunately, an implementation of the ELM can help increase the positive perceptions of counseling amongst the undergraduate student population. Students that repeatedly watched a video that explained the function and positive outcomes of mental health counseling demonstrated a significant and lasting change in their perception to counseling. Students who watched the video once or not at all maintained a relatively negative view towards counseling. Thus, repeated exposure towards the positive elements of counseling lead towards a greater elaboration and implementation of the central route to combat negative social stigma of counseling. Most negative intuitions exist within the realm of the peripheral route, and therefore to work against stigmas the general public needs to engage their central route of processing.

Counselor credibility

The more credible a counselor is perceived to be, the more likely that counseling clients are to perceive the counselor’s advice as impactful. However, counselor credibility is strongly mediated by the degree to which the client understands the information conveyed by the counselor. Therefore, it is extremely important that counseling clients feel that they understand their counselor. The use of metaphor is helpful for this. Metaphors require a deeper level of elaboration, thereby engaging the central route of processing. Kendall (2010) suggests using metaphor in counseling as a valid method towards helping clients understand the message/psychological knowledge conveyed by the client. When the client hears a metaphor that resonates with them, they are far more likely to trust and build positive rapport with the counselor.

In Organizations 
Li has expanded the theoretical frame of the ELM and applied it to information system acceptance. Li conducted a research on persuasive tactics for managers who needed to persuade staff to adopt new information systems within firms by integrating the ELM, social influence theory (It studies how a person is influenced by others in a network to conform to a community, and there are two types of social influences: informational and normative influences), and affective and cognition responses (or emotional responses and rational responses). Li's experiment suggested that: 1) managers should tailor their persuasive strategies according to various elaboration abilities of staff. For staff who have higher levels of elaboration likelihood, managers should emphasize benefits and values of new systems; For staff who have lower levels of elaboration likelihood, managers should provide expertise and credible sources; 2) Commonly speaking, providing strong arguments is more effective than relying on credibility; 3) Since normative influences lead to more affective responses and informational influences lead to more cognition responses, managers should implement different strategies to provoke staff's reaction, while 4) cognition responses are more important than affective responses when accepting a new system.

Methodological considerations

In designing a test for the aforementioned model, it is necessary to determine the quality of an argument, i.e., whether it is viewed as strong or weak. If the argument is not seen as strong, then the results of persuasion will be inconsistent. A strong argument is defined by Petty and Cacioppo as "one containing arguments such that when subjects are instructed to think about the message, the thoughts they generate are fundamentally favorable." An argument that is universally viewed as weak will elicit unfavorable results, especially if the subject considers it under high elaboration, thus being the central route. Test arguments must be rated by ease of understanding, complexity and familiarity. To study either route of the elaboration likelihood model, the arguments must be designed for consistent results. Also, when assessing persuasion of an argument, the influence of peripheral cues needs to be taken into consideration as cues can influence attitude even in the absence of argument processing. The extent or direction of message processing also needs to be taken into consideration when assessing persuasion, as variables can influence or bias thought by enabling or inhibiting the generation of a particular kind of thought in regard to the argument. "While the ELM theory continues to be widely cited and taught as one of the major cornerstones of persuasion, questions are raised concerning its relevance and validity in 21st century communication contexts."

Misinterpretions of the theory

Some researchers have been criticized for misinterpreting the ELM. One such instance is Kruglanski and Thompson, who write that the processing of central or peripheral routes is determined by the type of information that affects message persuasion. For example, message variables are only influential when the central route is used and information like source variables is only influential when the peripheral route is used. In fact, the ELM does not make statements about types of information being related to routes. Rather, the key to the ELM is how any type of information will be used depending on central or peripheral routes, regardless of what that information is. For example, the central route may permit source variables to influence preference for certain language usage in the message (e.g. "beautiful") or validate a related product (e.g. cosmetics), while the peripheral route may only lead individuals to associate the "goodness" of source variables with the message. Theoretically, all of these could occur simultaneously. Thus, the distinction between central and peripheral routes is not the type of information being processed as those types can be applied to both routes, but rather how that information is processed and ultimately whether processing information in one way or the other will result in different attitudes.

A second instance of misinterpretation is that processing of the central route solely involves thinking about the message content and not thoughts about the issue. Petty and Cacioppo (1981) stated "If the issue is very important to the person, but the person doesn't understand the arguments being presented in the message, or if no arguments are actually presented, then elaboration of arguments cannot occur. ... Nevertheless, the person may still be able to think about the issue." Therefore, issue-relevant thinking is still a part of the central route and is necessary for one to think about the message content.

Lastly, a third instance of misinterpretation by Kruglanski and Thompson is the disregard for the quantitative dimension presented by the ELM and more focus on the qualitative dimension. This quantitative dimension is the peripheral route involves low-elaboration persuasion that is quantitatively different from the central route that involves high elaboration. With this difference the ELM also explains that low-elaboration persuasion processes are qualitatively different as well. It is seen as incorrect if the ELM focuses on a quantitative explanation over a qualitative one; however one of the ELM's key points is that elaboration can range from high to low which is not incorrect as data from experiments conducted by Petty (1997) as well as Petty and Wegener (1999) suggest that persuasion findings can be explained by a quantitative dimension without ever needing a qualitative one.

Issues concerning the ELM 
In 2014, J. Kitchen et al. scrutinized the literatures of the ELM for the past 30 years. They came up with four major research areas that have received most significant criticism:

The descriptive nature of the model 
The first critique concerns issue of the model's initial development. Considering that the ELM was built upon previous empirical research and a diverse literature base to unify disparate ideas, the model is inherently descriptive because of the intuitive and conceptual assumptions underlying. For example, Choi and Salmon criticized Petty and Cacioppo's assumption that correct recall of a product led directly to high involvement. They proposed that high involvement is likely to be the result of other variations, for example the sample population; and the weak/strong arguments in one study are likely to result in different involvement characteristics in another study.

Continuum questions 
The elaboration likelihood continuum ought to show that a human can undergo a natural progression from high involvement to low involvement with the corresponding effects. This continuum can account for the swift between the central and the peripheral routes, but has yet been lack of comprehensive and empirical testing since the beginning. However, researches has been done under three distinct conditions: high, low, and moderate.

The issue of multi-channel processing 
This area of critique basically lands on the nature of ELM being a dual-process model, which indicates that the receivers will rely on one of the routes (central or peripheral) to process messages and possibly change attitude and behaviour. Stiff (1986) questioned the validity of ELM because the message should be able to be processed through two routes simultaneously. On top of Stiff's questioning, alternative models have been raised. Mackenzie et al (1986) advocated a Dual Mediation Hypothesis (DMH) that allow receivers to process the ad's content and its execution at the same time with reasonable vigilance. Lord et al. (1995) proposed a Combined Influence Hypothesis which argues that the central and peripheral cues worked in combination despite the variables of motivation and ability. Kruglanski et al. (1999) proposed a single cognitive process instead of the dual-process model. Although drawing on the fundamental conception from ELM, such as motivation, ability and continuum, the unimodel suggests a normative and heuristic rules for human to make judgement based on the evidence. The Heuristic Systematic Model (HSM) is another alternative model concerning this issue.

The analysis of the different variables which mediate elaboration likelihood 
Many studies have been expanding and/or refining the model by examining and testing the variables, particularly in advertising research. For example, Britner and Obermiller (1985) were among the first to expand the model to new variables under the peripheral processing. They proposed situation, person, and product categories as new variables under the context of marketing.

Alternative models
 Social judgment theory – emphasizes the distance in opinions, and whether it is in the "acceptance latitude" or "rejection latitude" or in the intermediate zone.
 Social impact theory – emphasizes the number, strength and immediacy of the people trying to influence a person to change their mind.
 Heuristic-systematic model
 Extended transportation-imagery model

See also

 Advertising
 Advertising management
 Attitude change
 Cognitive biases
 Cognitive resources
 Consumer behaviour
 Countersignaling
 E-commerce
 Integrated marketing communications
 Marketing
 Marketing communications
 Motivation
 Need for cognition
 Online shopping
 Persuasion

Advertising models

References

Further reading 
 Eagly A. and Chaiken S. Psychology of Attitudes. Harcourt, Brace and Jovanovich, Fort Worth, Texas, 2003.
 
 Metzler A. et al. National HIV Prevention Conference, Bola88, Atlanta, Georgia, 1999.
 Petty R. and Cacioppo J., Brown W. and Dubuque I. (ed.) Attitudes and Persuasion: Classic and Contemporary Approaches. 
 Petty R. and Wegener D., Chaiken S. and Trope Y. (ed.) "The elaboration likelihood model: current status and controversies." Dual Process Theories in Social Psychology Guilford Press, New York. p41 - 72.
 Richard E. Petty and John T. Cacioppo, The Elaboration likelihood model of Persuasion. 1986. p136.

Petty, R., & Cacioppo, J. (1986). Communication and persuasion : central and peripheral routes to attitude change . New York: Springer-Verlag.
Yocco, V. (2014). “Applying the Elaboration Likelihood Model to Design”. A List Apart.  
Mary J. Bitner and Carl Obermiller (1985), "The Elaboration Likelihood Model: Limitations and Extensions in Marketing", in NA - Advances in Consumer Research Volume 12, eds. Elizabeth C. Hirschman and Moris B. Holbrook, Provo, UT : Association for Consumer Research, Pages: 420-425.

Attitude change
Advertising
Promotion and marketing communications